The 2020 Nepal Tri-Nation Series was the fifth round of the 2019–2023 ICC Cricket World Cup League 2 cricket tournament and took place in Nepal in February 2020. It was a tri-nation series between Nepal, Oman and the United States cricket teams, with the matches played as One Day International (ODI) fixtures. The ICC Cricket World Cup League 2 formed part of the qualification pathway to the 2023 Cricket World Cup. The matches were the first ODIs to be played in Nepal. On 20 January 2020, the United States confirmed their squad for the series, with Steven Taylor stripped of his vice-captaincy role for disciplinary issues, but being retained in the squad.

Oman won their first three matches. In the last fixture of the series, the United States were bowled out for 35 runs, the joint-lowest total in an ODI match.

Squads

In the first match, Nepal's Sharad Vesawkar suffered an injury and was ruled out of the rest of the series, with Subash Khakurel replacing him.

Fixtures

1st ODI

2nd ODI

3rd ODI

4th ODI

5th ODI

6th ODI

References

External links
 Series home at ESPN Cricinfo

2020 in American cricket
2020 in Nepalese cricket
2020 in Omani cricket
International cricket competitions in 2019–20
Nepal
February 2020 sports events in Asia